Henry Griffiths may refer to:

Bob Griffiths (writer) (Henry Robert Griffiths), born April 16, 1938, is an author, playwright, and speaker
H. W. Griffiths, photographer

See also
Harry Griffiths (disambiguation)
Henry Griffith (disambiguation)